Bow Lake Village is a small unincorporated community in the town of Strafford, New Hampshire, located at the outlet of Bow Lake. The village is home to the Bow Lake Grange, Isinglass Country Store, Uncle George's Market (formerly the Blue Loon and Sheila's), the old Waldron Store (owned by the Strafford Historical Society) and the Bow Lake Inn. The village's main roads are New Hampshire Route 202A, which connects it to Northwood and Center Strafford; Province Road, which follows the north shore of the lake; and Water Street, which follows the south shore.

References

Unincorporated communities in New Hampshire
Unincorporated communities in Strafford County, New Hampshire
Strafford, New Hampshire